Żakowice may refer to the following places:
Żakowice, Kuyavian-Pomeranian Voivodeship (north-central Poland)
Żakowice, Kutno County in Łódź Voivodeship (central Poland)
Żakowice, Łódź East County in Łódź Voivodeship (central Poland)
Żakowice, Greater Poland Voivodeship (west-central Poland)
Żakowice, Warmian-Masurian Voivodeship (north Poland)